Bill Morrison or Billy Morrison is the name of:

 Bill Morrison (director) (born 1965), American filmmaker
 Bill Morrison (comics) (born 1959), co-founder of Bongo Comics
 Bill Morrison (politician) (1928–2013), Australian politician for the Division of St George
 Bill Morrison (trade unionist) (fl. from 1938), British trade union leader
 Billy Morrison (born 1969), British guitarist and singer
 Billy Morrison (footballer), footballer for Fulham F.C. 1904–1908

See also 
 Bill Mollison (1928–2016), Australian researcher, author, scientist, teacher, and biologist
 William Morrison (disambiguation)